The Islamic Jihad Movement in Palestine (Harakat al-Jihād al-Islāmi fi Filastīn), known in the West simply as Palestinian Islamic Jihad (PIJ), is a Palestinian Islamist paramilitary and terrorist organization formed in 1981.

PIJ formed as an offshoot of the Muslim Brotherhood and was influenced ideologically in its formation by the Islamic regime in Iran. It is a member of the Alliance of Palestinian Forces, which rejects the Oslo Accords and whose objective is the establishment of a sovereign Islamic Palestinian state. It calls for the military destruction of Israel and rejects a two-state solution. The organization's financial backing has historically come mainly from Syria and Hezbollah. Since 2014, PIJ has seen its power steadily increase with the backing of funds from Iran.

The armed wing of PIJ is Al-Quds Brigades, also formed in 1981, which is active in the West Bank and the Gaza Strip, with its main strongholds in the West Bank being the cities of Hebron and Jenin. Its operations have included suicide bombings, attacks on Israeli civilians, as well as the firing of rockets into Israel. PIJ has been designated a terrorist organisation by the United States, the European Union, the United Kingdom, Japan, Canada, Australia, New Zealand and Israel.

History and background

PIJ was formally established in Gaza in 1981 by two Palestinian activists: Dr Fathi abd al-Aziz Shaqaqi, a Rafah-based physician, and Shaykh Abd al-Aziz Awda, an Islamic preacher from the Jabaliyya refugee camp, as well as Ramadan Shalah, Bashir Moussa and three other Palestinian radicals. Based in Egypt, Shaqaqi and Awda were originally members of the Muslim Brotherhood. Their views on the destruction of Israel, however, led them in 1979 to establish Islamic Jihad-Shaqaqi Faction, a branch of the Egyptian Islamic Jihad. and conducted operations out of Egypt. The Shaqaqi Faction was expelled from Egypt in 1981 following the assassination of Egypt's President Anwar Sadat by the Egyptian Islamic Jihad. Shaqaqi and Awda returned to Gaza where they formally established PIJ, from where it continued its operations.

The aim of the organization was the establishment of a sovereign, Islamic Palestinian state within the geographic borders of pre-1948 Mandatory Palestine. Completely rejecting the political process, the organization professes that its goals can only be achieved through military means.

PIJ began its armed operations against Israel in 1984. In 1988, its leaders were exiled by Israel to Lebanon. While in Lebanon, the group received training, support and other backing from Hezbollah and its backers in Iran, and developed a close relationship with the organization. In 1990, the headquarters of PIJ moved to the Syrian capital, Damascus, where it continues to be based, with offices in Beirut, Tehran, and Khartoum.

PIJ masterminded several suicide bombings in Israel, the first one being the Tel Aviv–Jerusalem bus 405 suicide attack in 1989 which resulted in 16 civilian deaths. (See List of Palestinian suicide attacks.) Shaqaqi was a key player in setting up the Alliance of Palestinian Forces in January 1994, a coalition of eight PLO groups, Islamic Jihad and Hamas, rejecting the Oslo process. PIJ was and continues to be considered by Israel the most extreme organization in its operational methods and commitment to the destruction of Israel. By 1995 PIJ was, according to Fisk, "perhaps the fiercest of all Israel's modern-day enemies." Shaqaqi was assassinated in 1995 in Malta, and Ramadan Shalah became secretary-general of the organisation.  There was a subsequent crackdown on the PIJ by Israel and the Palestinian National Authority which led to a significant weakening of the organization.

On 20 February 2003, University of South Florida computer engineering professor Sami Al-Arian was arrested after being indicted on a terrorism-related charge. U.S. Attorney General John Ashcroft alleged at a press conference that Al-Arian was the North American head of the Palestinian Islamic Jihad. On 6 December 2006, Sami Al-Arian was sentenced to 57 months in prison, pursuant to a plea bargain. In November 2006 he was found guilty of civil contempt for refusing to testify before a federal grand jury and served 21 months in prison on that conviction. On 27 June 2014, the US Federal Government dropped all charges against Al-Arian.

PIJ is alleged to have used minors. On 29 March 2004, 15-year-old Tamer Khuweir of Rifidia, a suburb of Palestinian city Nablus in the West Bank, was captured by Israeli forces as he planned to carry out a suicide mission. His older brother claimed he was brainwashed and demanded the Palestinian Authority investigate the incident and arrest those responsible for it.

Following further terrorist attacks on civilians in Israel, Shalah and Awda were indicted under United States law and added in 2006 to the United States FBI Most Wanted Terrorists list.

In February 2012, the Hamas government in the Gaza Strip distanced itself from PIJ. During the March 2012 Gaza–Israel clashes, which followed the Israeli assassination of Popular Resistance Committees leader, Zuhir al-Qaisi, who bragged of kidnapping Gilad Shalit, PIJ and PRC opened attacks on Israel. Hamas refrained from joining PIJ and PRC in attacking Israel. Over a hundred Palestinians were killed or injured in the ensuing violence, but Israel did not attack any Hamas targets at the time. The eventual ceasefire was negotiated between Israel and the militant groups, not Hamas.

London-based Arabic newspaper Asharq al-Awsat reported in May 2015 that Iran had stopped funding PIJ due to the group's neutrality over the Saudi Arabian-led intervention in Yemen, throwing PIJ into a severe financial crisis. Iran had expected PIJ to condemn the intervention led by Saudi Arabia, Iran's chief regional rival. Palestinian newspaper al-Quds reported that Iran is now supporting an offshoot of PIJ called as-Sabirin (Arabic for "the patient ones"), headed by Islamic Jihad veteran Hisham Salem.

Under the former leadership of Ramadan Shalah, the group would receive approximately US$70 million per year from the Islamic Revolutionary Guard Corps of Iran.

Ideology, motives and beliefs

Ramadan Shalah was interviewed by a delegation from the World Federation of Scientists in Damascus, Syria, on 15 December 2009. In the interview, he argued that the Israelis will accept neither a two state nor a one state solution and that the only choice is to continue the armed struggle until Israel's defeat.

We are the indigenous people of the land. I was born in Gaza. My family, brothers and sisters, live in Gaza. But I am not allowed to visit them. But any American or Siberian Jew is allowed to take our land. There is no possibility today of a two-state solution. That idea is dead. And there is no real prospect of a one-state solution...

I will never, under any conditions, accept the existence of the state of Israel. I have no problem living with the Jewish people...

We have lived together in peace for centuries. And if Netanyahu were to ask if we can live together in one state, I would say to him: "If we have exactly the same rights as Jews to come to all of Palestine. If Khaled Meshaal and Ramadan Shalah can come whenever they want, and visit Haifa, and buy a home in Herzliyah if they want, then we can have a new language, and dialogue is possible."

The group is a Sunni Jhadist movement but includes other religious beliefs.

Activities

Militant activities
The Palestinian Islamic Jihad has claimed responsibility for many militant activities over the years. The organization is responsible for a number of attacks including more than 30 suicide bombings; indeed, on 22 December 2001, PIJ vowed to continue its campaign despite Hamas' decision to halt suicide bombings inside Israel in response to an alleged crackdown by Yasser Arafat. PIJ's representative in Lebanon, Abu Imad Al-Rifai noted, "Our position is to continue. We have no other choice. We are not willing to compromise." The international community considers the use of indiscriminate attacks on civilian populations and the use of human shields as illegal under international law.

The Palestinian Islamic Jihad have claimed responsibility for the following attacks:

List of attacks
 August 1987: The PIJ claimed responsibility for a shooting that killed the commander of the Israeli military police in the Gaza Strip.
 July 1989: Attack of Egged bus 405 along the Jerusalem–Tel Aviv highway, at least 14 people killed (including two Canadians and one American) and dozens more wounded. Though intended to be a suicide attack, the perpetrator survived.
 4 February 1990: A bus carrying Israeli tourists in Egypt was attacked. The attack left 11 people, including 9 Israelis dead and 17 others injured.
 February 1992: in Night of the Pitchforks, killed three Israeli soldiers asleep in their base, using knives, axes and a pitchfork
 6 April 1992: an Israeli Army convoy was ambushed in Hula, South Lebanon. Two soldiers were killed and 5 wounded. The target had been Major-General Yitzhak Mordechai, head of Israel’s Northern Command. But he had left the convoy earlier. Three of the attackers were killed.
 December 1993: Killed an Israeli reservist, David Mashrati, during a public bus shooting.
 April 1994: A car bomb aboard a public bus killed 9 people and injured 50.
 January 1995: Bomb attack near Netanya killing eighteen soldiers and one civilian.
 April 1995: Bomb Attack in Netzarim and Kfar Darom. The first bomb killed 8 people including American student, Alisa Flatow, and injured over 30 on an Israel bus; the second attack was a car bomb that injured 12 people.
 March 1996: A Tel Aviv shopping mall is the site of another bombing killing 20 and injuring 75.
 November 2000: A car bomb in Jerusalem at an outdoor market killed 2 people and injured 10.
 March 2002: A bomb killed seven people and injured approximately thirty aboard a bus travelling from Tel Aviv to Nazareth.
 June 2002: Eighteen people are killed and fifty injured in an attack at the Megiddo Junction.
 July 2002: A double attack in Tel Aviv killed five people and injured 40.
 November 2002: 12 soldiers and security personnel killed in an ambush in Hebron.
 May 2003: Three people killed and eighty-three injured in a suicide bombing at a shopping mall in Afula.
 August 2003: A bomber killed 21 people and injured more than 100 people on a bus in Jerusalem.
 October 2003: A bomb killed 22 and injured 60 at a Haifa restaurant.
 October 2005: A bomb detonated in a Hadera market was responsible for killing seven people and injuring 55, five of them severely.
 April 2006: A bomb in a Tel Aviv eatery killed eleven and injured 70.
 January 2007: Both the al-Aqsa Martyrs' Brigades and the PIJ claim responsibility for a suicide bombing at an Eilat bakery that killed three.
 June 2007, in a failed assault on an IDF position at the Kissufim crossing between Gaza and Israel in a possible attempt to kidnap IDF soldiers, four armed members of the al-Quds Brigades (the military wing of Islamic Jihad) and the al-Aqsa Martyrs' Brigades (the military wing of Fatah) allegedly used a vehicle marked with "TV" and "PRESS" insignias penetrated the border fence and assaulted a guard tower in what Islamic Jihad and the army said was a failed attempt to capture an Israeli soldier. IDF troops killed one militant, while the others escaped. The use of a vehicle that resembled a press vehicle evoked a sharp response from many journalists and news organizations. The Middle East director for Human Rights Watch Sarah Leah Whitsonn responded, "Using a vehicle with press markings to carry out a military attack is a serious violation of the laws of war, and it also puts journalists at risk." The FPA responded by saying,

Armored vehicles marked with TV are an invaluable protection for genuine journalists working in hostile environments. The FPA has long campaigned for the continued availability of armored vehicles for its members, despite official opposition in some quarters. The abuse of this recognized protection for the working journalist is a grave development and we condemn those that carried it out. Such an incident will reduce the protection offered by marked vehicles.

 During a press conference, an Islamic Jihad spokesperson Abu Ahmed denied that they had put press markings on the jeep used in the attack and said, "The Al-Quds Brigades used an armoured jeep resembling military armoured jeeps used by the Zionist intelligence services."
 On 26 March 2009, two Islamic Jihad members were imprisoned for a conspiracy "to murder Israeli pilots and scientists using booby-trapped toy cars".
 On 15 November 2012, Islamic Jihad fired two Fajr-5s at Tel Aviv from Gaza, one landing in an uninhabited area of the suburbs and the other in the sea.
 On 24 June 2013, six rockets were fired into Israel; major news outlets reported that the Islamic Jihad were behind the attacks.
 In March 2014 over 100 rockets were launched into southern Israel by PIJ and other Islamist groups.  On 14 March Shalah announced that the attack was coordinated with Hamas.

Islamic Jihad has also deployed its own rocket, similar to the Qassam rocket used by Hamas, called the al-Quds rocket.

Social services
Islamic Jihad also control dozens of religious organizations in the Palestinian territories that are registered as NGOs and operate mosques, schools, and medical facilities that offer free services. Like other Islamic associations, these are heavily scrutinized by the Palestinian National Authority who have shut some of them down. In one Islamic Jihad kindergarten graduation, children dressed up in military uniforms, waved guns, shouted anti-Israel slogans, and spoke of blowing themselves up to kill "Zionists".

Islamic Jihad also operates dozens of summer camps for children. They have opened up 51 summer camps which attracted approximately 10,000 children in 2010.

We teach the children the truth. How the Jews persecuted the prophets and tortured them. We stress that the Jews killed and slaughtered Arabs and Palestinians every chance they got. Most important, the children understand that the conflict with the Jews is not over land, but rather over religion. As long as Jews remain here, between the [Jordan] river and the sea, they will be our enemy and we will continue to pursue and kill them. When they leave we won't hurt them.

Notable PIJ members

Secretaries-General
 Fathi Shaqaqi: founder of PIJ, 1981–1995, assassinated by Mossad gunmen.
 Ramadan Shalah: founder of PIJ, 1995–2018.
 Ziyad al-Nakhalah: 2018–present.

Other members
 Mahmoud Tawalbe: senior leader in Jenin, killed during Operation Defensive Shield by an IDF Caterpillar D9, 2002.
 Mahmoud Seader: leader in Hebron.
 Hanadi Jaradat: female suicide bomber, committed the Maxim restaurant suicide bombing, 4 October 2003.
 Mohammed Dadouh: senior commander in Gaza, assassinated by Israeli missile, 21 May 2006.
 Mahmoud al-Majzoub: member of the Shura Council, killed by car bomb, 26 May 2006.
 Husam Jaradat: senior commander in Jenin, cousin of Hanadi Jaradat, assassinated in the Jenin refugee quarters, 30 August 2006.
 Ayman al-Fayed: senior commander of Gaza Strip, assassinated in a blast in the Bureij refugee camp, 16 February 2008.
 Ziad Abu-Tir: senior member of the military wing was killed in an Israeli airstrike in the Khan Younis area, 29 December 2008.
 Khaled Shalan: senior commander killed by an Israeli missile strike on his car in Gaza, 4 March 2009.
 Baha Abu al-Ata: leader killed by an Israeli missile strike in Gaza, 12 November 2019.
 Akram al-Ajouri: leader who survived an Israeli airstrike in Damascus, 12 November 2019, but his son and daughter were killed.
 Khaled al-Batsh: current PIJ leader in the Gaza Strip.
 Tayseer Jabari: military leader who succeeded Baha Abu al-Ata, killed on 5 August 2022 during Operation Breaking Dawn.
 Khaled Mansour: southern command chief, killed on 6 August 2022 during Operation Breaking Dawn.

See also

Black September
Democratic Front for the Liberation of Palestine (DFLP)
Hamas
Hezbollah
Islamization of Gaza
Israeli–Palestinian conflict
List of Palestinian Islamic Jihad suicide attacks
March 2012 Gaza–Israel clashes
Palestinian political violence
Popular Front for the Liberation of Palestine (PFLP)

References

Further reading
Islamic Jihad Movement in Palestine official website
BBC: Israel and the Palestinians

Quartet to Syria: Block 'Jihad' 5 December 2005

 
1980 establishments in Asia
Military units and formations established in 1980
Islamist groups
Muslim Brotherhood
Palestinian political parties
Sunni Islamic political parties
Anti-Zionism in the Palestinian territories
Organizations based in Asia designated as terrorist
Organisations designated as terrorist by Australia
Organizations designated as terrorist by Canada
Organisations designated as terrorist by the European Union
Organizations designated as terrorist by Israel
Organisations designated as terrorist by Japan
Organisations designated as terrorist by New Zealand
Organisations designated as terrorist by the United Kingdom
Organizations designated as terrorist by the United States